Ōnyūdō is a yōkai, or supernatural monster, told about in parts of Japan.

Summary
Their name has the meaning of "big monk," but depending on area, there are various legends where their actual appearance is that of an unclear shadow, simply a giant rather than a monk, among others. The ones that look like a monk (bōzu) are also called ōbōzu. In size, there are those that are about two meters tall, slightly larger than that of a human, to giants that about the size of a mountain.

There are many legends where ōnyūdō menace people and many legends where those who see one become ill. There are also stories where they are foxes (kitsune) or tanuki in disguise, or something that a stone pagoda shapeshifts into, but many of them are of unknown true identity.

Legends by area

Ōnyūdō that inflict harm to people
Example from Hokkaido
In the years of Kaei, an ōnyūdō appeared in an Ainu village near Lake Shikotsu ridge and the mountain Fuppushidake. It is said that those who were glared at by its large eyeballs faint as if their "ki" (qi) was touched.
Example from Tokyo
During Showa 12 in the middle of the second world war (1937). People who were sending "red letters" (military summons notices that were red in color) were attacked at the Hachiman level crossing near the Akabane Station by an ōnyūdō with the appearance of a soldier, and died of an unnatural death 4 days later. It is said that the ōnyūdō's true identity was a ghost of a conscript who committed suicide, or was a soldier who was criticized for his failures and beaten to death by his superiors. Incidentally, it is said that around that area, nobody has received a red letter.
It is an unusual example of a human's spirit turning into an ōnyūdō.

Ōnyūdō that help people
In Azashiro, Takawagawara village, Myōzai District, Awa Province (now Ishii, Myōzai District, Tokushima Prefecture), by leaving rice in the water wheel of the creek, an ōnyūdō with a height two jō and eight shaku (about 8.5 meters) would appear, and is said to hull the rice for that person. However, by looking at how the ōnyūdō is hulling it, one would get menaced by it.

Ōnyūdō that animals turn into
Example from Iwate Prefecture
In an oral tradition told in the Shiwa District, Iwate Prefecture, from the "" told by Bokuseki Tamamushi.
At the Kōden-ji at Daijikō field, Tokuta, in the aforementioned district, a mysterious fire would flare up every night in the main temple building, and since a dreadful ōnyūdō would appear from its shadow, a temple supporter was requested to keep night watch. At any rate since it happened every night, people thought of it as suspicious, and it was rumored to have perhaps been a fox or tanuki.
One winter, when light snow was falling one morning, there were footsteps of a weasel coming from the main temple building. After chasing it, since it went below the fireplace in a small neighboring wooden shed, and thus was surrounded by many villagers, and after taking away the fireplace and looking inside, there was the nest of a weasel. The old weasel from the nest was captured and killed.
After that, the mysterious fire and the ōnyūdō did not appear again.
Example from the Miyagi Prefecture
At Isedō mountain　that once went around Sendai, there was a large rock that made a groaning voice every night. Furthermore, there was a story where it would turn into a towering giant ōnyūdō.
The feudal lord at that time, Date Masamune, was suspicious of this strange occurrence and made his servants investigate, but the returning servants confirmed that the ōnyūdō certainly appeared and was unmanageable, and everybody turned pale.
Masamune, who had much fortitude, went out to exterminate the ōnyūdō himself. When he arrived, there was a conspicuously large groaning voice, and a nyūdō much larger than usual appeared. Masamune, not being frightened at all, shot an arrow at the foot of the nyūdō, and with an agonizing death cry, the nyūdō disappeared. Next to the rock, there was an otter as big as a calf that was groaning, and the nyūdō was this otter turned into a monster. It is said that after that, this hill was called "unarizaka" (groaning hill).
This "unarizaka" actually exists in Aoba-ku, Sendai city, but on the stone monument that shows the name of this hill, it states that the name came from the groaning voices of calves that carried loads up the hill, which is the more established theory than the yōkai tale.

Other ōnyūdō
Example from Toyama Prefecture
In Kurobekyō valley, Shimoniikawa District, Etchū Province, 16 ōnyūdō appeared, surprising the visitors of the Kanetsuri onsen who were there for a hot spring cure. It had a height of five to six jō (about 15 to 18 meters), and it is said that it gave off a beautiful seven-colored aureola. Since the aureola shares many characteristics as the halo from the Brocken spectre, there is the theory that its true identity was the shadow of the hot spring visitors reflected by the heat of the onsen.
Example from Ehime Prefecture
In the middle of the Edo period, near the bridge Toyobashi in Mikawa Province, when a secondhand clothing salesman was on the way to Nagoya for business, he encountered an ōnyūdō. It is said to have had a height of one jō and three to four shaku (about four meters), and is thus one of the smaller ōnyūdō.
Example from Shiga Prefecture
It is written about in the informational miscellaneous records "," from Edo period, in volume sixteen titled "." One autumn night, a large rain fell at the base of Mount Ibuki, and the earth shook violently. Before long, an ōnyūdō appeared from the field, and its body was lit left and right under a torchlight while it advanced.
The surrounding villagers were surprised by the violent sound of footsteps, and tried to leave, but the elders of the village were violently held back. Finally, the sound stopped, and when the villagers came out, the grass on the road was completely burned all the way to the peak of the mountain. According to the elders, an ōnyūdō appeared at Lake Myōjin and walked all the way to the peak of Mount Ibuki. Thus it is one of the larger ones among ōnyūdō.
Example from Hyōgo Prefecture
According to the "," in September of one of the years of Enpō, at night in Harima Province, somebody named Mizutani (水谷) brought along a dog to hunt in the mountain recesses, when he witnessed an ōnyūdō looking like a mountain staring at him. It is said to be so large that it could straddle a mountain (several thousands of meters large). It was rumored to have been mountain god warning against the killing of life.
In the same way, in Sayō District in the same area, in May of one year of Genroku, Heishirō Kajiya would have a net at night, and when he went to the mountain recesses to fish, he witnessed an ōnyūdō about three meters large pull tight on the net from the upper reaches of the river, and Heishirō who held his stomach steady without being startled at all went along, and it is said that the ōnyūdō disappeared after walking several hundred meters.
Also in the Sayō District, when a person name Gosuke Hayase, during the evening when the surroundings have become dark, when he was returning while clinging on someone else to help with the poor visibility, they found an ōnyūdō about three meters large standing in their way, and they ran past it in a rush to escape, but he was then unable to see the person who he traveled with.
Example from Kumamoto Prefecture
It is a story from Shimagōko field, Toyono, Shimomashiki District, Kumamoto Prefecture (now Uki). There is a hill called "Ima ni mo Saka" but in the past, an ōnyūdō would appear surprising passersby. After that, when people would talk about that and pass this hill, it is said that they would hear a voice "ima ni mo (even now)," and the ōnyūdō would appear. This name "Ima ni mo Saka" comes from this ōnyūdō.

Ōnyūdō in festivals
"Ōnyūdō" of Yokkaichi

In Yokkaichi, Mie Prefecture, in the Yokkaichi Festival performed at Suwa-jinja every year in October, it is known that there is an ōnyūdō festival float (Mie Prefecture Concrete Folk Cultural Property). This is from one of Suwa-jinja's parishioner villagers, Okeno town (now Nakanaya town), but it has been determined to have been made in the years of Bunka, and as one of the elegances of the religious festivals of the city, it is thought using the characters 大化 to fit the town name of "Oke," it was an advancement of something dedicated to the costume parade "Bakemono Tsukushi" (化け物尽くし), but there is the following folktale that is told.
In the town of Okeno, an old tanuki settled down in the cellar of a soy sauce shop, and laying waste to the agricultural produce, it turned into an ōnyūdō and performed misdeeds like menacing people. The people who were very trouble about this made a doll of an ōnyūdō to oppose it, but the tanuki then became an ōnyūdō that was even bigger than the doll. Then, the people made it so that the neck of the ōnyūdō became flexible, and when the doll and tanuki faced each other for the ōnyūdō showdown, the stretching of the neck was shown. It is said that the tanuki thus gave up here, and ran away.
The ōnyūdō that rides above the festival float about 2.2 meters tall has a body height of about 3.9 meters and a crooked neck with a length of about 2.2 meters before extension, and it is a large mechanical doll that can stick out its toungue and change its eyeball. Imitating this, a paper doll of the ōnyūdō with an extendable neck is also a souvenir of the local area. It is also put out in the citizen festival, the Daiyokkaichi Festival that takes place in August of every year among others, and has become a symbol character of Yokkaichi.

Notes

References

See also
 List of legendary creatures from Japan

Yōkai
Mythological monsters
Japanese giants